The Black Rock Lock is a ship lock in Buffalo, New York, that allows vessels to bypass rapids on the Niagara River at the outlet of Lake Erie. The original lock at Black Rock was built in 1833 following the completion of the Erie Canal. The current, larger lock was completed in 1913.

History
The first lock at Black Rock was constructed in 1833 as part of the Erie Canal. The modern lock was built by the U.S. Army Corps of Engineers from 1908 to 1913. It has the facility to house large Great Lakes vessels that have carried essential goods to business and industry in Western New York.  The lock was first rehabilitated in 1975. From 1984 to 1986, the locks guard gates and the operating system were rehabilitated. Since the 1990s many things have been done to provide a safer work environment, such as the installation of new fencing, railing and ladders. Other things like the refurbishing of the lock houses, and the widening and capping of all concrete approach walls have been done as well.

Black Rock Channel
The Black Rock Channel extends from Buffalo Harbor to the Black Rock Lock. The Black Rock Channel was constructed to provide protection to reefs, rapids and fast currents in the upstream Niagara River. Although both pleasure craft and commercial vessels are allowed in the channel it is required that the pleasure craft yield the right of way to all commercial vessels.

There are three bridges that cross the channel. They are the Peace Bridge, the Ferry Street Bridge and the International Railroad Bridge. The Peace Bridge is the first bridge that is passed coming from the south entrance of the channel. The Ferry Bridge has a clearance of 17.3 above the LWD. Then  for the south channel entrance comes the International Railroad Bridge. This is a swing bridge which has a clearance of  LWD when closed.

References

Channels of New York (state)
Transportation buildings and structures in Buffalo, New York
Locks of New York (state)
Erie Canal